Parudur is a village and gram panchayat in Pattambi taluk, Palakkad district in the state of Kerala, India. Parudur was originally a part of Kuttippuram Block Panchayat in Tirur Taluk of erstwhile Kozhikode district, before the formation of Malappuram district. After the formation of  Malappuram district, Tirur Taluk became a part of Malappuram and Parudur village was transferred to Ottapalam Taluk. Today it forms part of Pattambi taluk. 

The village is in the Trithala Niyamasabha constituency and the Ponnani Lok Sabha constituency represented by CPI(M) and IUML respectively.

Its panchayat president is APM Zakkariya

Demographics
 India census, Parudur had a population of 24,345 with 11,572 males and 12,773 females.

References

Villages in Palakkad district
Gram panchayats in Palakkad district